The following is a list of Scottish clans with and without chiefs.

The crest badges used by members of Scottish clans are based upon armorial bearings recorded by the Lord Lyon King of Arms in the Public Register of All Arms and Bearings in Scotland. The blazon of the heraldic crest is given, and the heraldic motto with its translation into English. While all the crest badges of the clan names listed are recognised by the Lord Lyon King of Arms, only about one half of these (about 140) have a clan chief who is acknowledged by the Lord Lyon King of Arms as the rightful claimant of the undifferenced arms upon which the crest badges are based.

Scottish crest badges are heraldic badges used by members of Scottish clans to show their allegiance to a specific clan or clan chief. Even though they are commonly used by clan members, the heraldic crest and motto within the crest badge belong only to the clan chief – never the clan member. A Scottish clan member's crest badge is made up of a heraldic crest, encircled by a strap and buckle which contains a heraldic motto. In most cases, both crest and motto are derived from the crest and motto of the chief's coat of arms. Crest badges intended for wear as cap badges are commonly made of silver or some other metal such as pewter. In the case of armigers they wear their own crest within a plain circlet showing their own motto or slogan, not a belt and buckle showing the chief's. Women may wear a crest badge as a brooch to pin a sash of their clan tartan at the right shoulder of their gown or blouse. Female clan chiefs, chieftains, or the wives of clan chiefs normally wear a tartan sash pinned at their left shoulder.

Today, Scottish crest badges are commonly used by members of Scottish clans. However, much like clan tartans, Scottish crest badges do not have a long history, and owe much to Victorian era romanticism, and the dress of the Highland Regiments. Scottish crest badges have only been worn by clan members on the bonnet since the 19th century.

See also

 Scottish clan
 List of Irish clans
 List of ancient Celtic peoples and tribes
 Celtic peoples
 Tartans of Scotland

References

Bibliography

 
Sir Thomas Innes of Learney, Lord Lyon, Scots Heraldry (second edition), Oliver and Boyd, London,1956
 
 
 Moncreiffe of that Ilk, Iain. The Highland Clans. London: Barrie & Rockliff, 1967.
 
 
 
 

 List
Scottish